Bulbul Lalitakala Academy (now known as Bulbul Academy of Fine Arts or BAFA) is an institution of fine arts established in Dhaka on 17 May 1955, founded by Begum Afroza BulBul, wife of Bulbul Chowdhury, under the financial support of the government.

Roles
Students have to be present in their classes. Students with less than 70% attendance will not be able to sit for the two examinations. While attending any course at the academy students must take permission to attend radio, TV or any other programs from the academy authority.

References

External links

 Online-Dhaka.com - BAFA

Old Dhaka
Cultural organisations based in Bangladesh
Schools in Dhaka District
Education in Bangladesh
1955 establishments in East Pakistan
Clubs and societies in Bangladesh